Mohammed Fazle Rabbee (occasionally spelled Rabbi, ; 21 September 1932 – 15 December 1971) was a renowned cardiologist and a published medical researcher. He was the joint professor of Cardiology and Internal Medicine at Dhaka Medical College and Hospital. He was noted for his progressive thinking and unconventional beliefs for a modern Bengali society. He was murdered in the intellectual killing during the 1971 genocide in Bangladesh by Pakistani army and its local collaborators, the Jamaat-affiliated Al-Badr militia.

Biography 

Rabbee was born on 21 September 1932, in Pabna District, Bengal Presidency, British India. He was an exceptional student. In 1948, he passed matriculation from Pabna Zilla School and HSC from Dhaka College in 1950. Afterwards, he went to Dhaka Medical College and finished his MBBS in 1955. He was the youngest medical graduate of his time. Rabbee was awarded a gold medal for achieving highest marks on the examination in all of Pakistan. At Dhaka Medical College and Hospital, he became an assistant surgeon on 15 December 1956.

Rabbee and Dr. Jahan Ara Rabbee were married on 8 January 1957. Jahan had been a student attending Dhaka Medical College at the time. They raised four children, but the youngest died soon after his birth.

Rabbee became Registrar of Medicine in 1959 at Dhaka Medical College. In March 1960, he travelled to England to earn higher education, where he earned an MRCP in cardiology and another one in internal medicine. Rabbee received these two post-graduate degrees in record time by 1962. In lieu of obtaining his MRCP from London, he worked at the Hammersmith Hospital. Upon graduation, he worked at Middlesex Hospital with Sir Francis Avery Jones, an eminent British gastroenterologist. After Rabbee finished his studies, he returned to East Pakistan on 1 January 1963, where he became an associate professor of medicine at the Dhaka Medical College. He was soon promoted as Professor of Medicine and Cardiology in 1968 and was the youngest MRCP staff member to achieve this promotion in Dhaka Medical College at the age of 36.

Personal beliefs and political movements 

According to his daughter Nusrat, Rabbee was a man of science with a progressive philosophy. The Language Movement in 1952 opened his eyes to the tyranny and repression of the Pakistani government against its Bengali speaking citizens. The Pakistani government used to suppress and deprive east Pakistan and used to neglect their language, culture, and secular philosophy. The Bengali were used to be deprived in every sectors regarding promotions, ranks and benefits.

In 1969, at the post-graduate Institute of Medicine in Dhaka, he laid out his vision for a classless society. The speech by Pakistan's topmost professor in medicine evoked strong emotions from the students and colleagues. The captivating speech inspired everyone to provide good medical care for free to those who couldn't afford it. The Pakistani government took him in for questioning after the speech. The army charged that Rabbee was too popular.

In 1970 when the repression of East Pakistanis reached a peak, Rabbee received the Pakistan best professor award which he refused to accept. On 27 March 1971 he became very disturbed when he visited Dhaka medical college (his workplace) with his wife and saw the extent of the massacre committed by Pakistani army on innocent civilians and the faculty of Dhaka university. Both he and his wife provided medical care, surgery, money, shelter and transportation cost to refugee camps to families of those who were killed, as well as for survivors of torture and rape.

Early in December 1971, Rabbee cautioned poet and activist Sufia Kamal to leave Dhaka, but he himself did not leave and was caught by the Pakistani Army and its collaborators. According to Kamal, he was one of the intellectuals and other important people who "proved their patriotism to their motherland by sacrificing their lives".

Research 

Rabbee was an exceptional clinician, as well as a medical researcher. Throughout the subcontinent, people sought him out to diagnose difficult cases that could not be diagnosed or treated by local physicians. Rabbee combined a holistic approach towards health with cutting-edge science. For his poor patients, this popular doctor, gave free medical treatment, medicine, transportation and hospitalisation costs. He was extremely well liked by child and elderly patients, because he took the time to interact with them and to understand the root causes of their clinical symptoms.

Rabbee also did research on medicine, and has had his research-based articles published in the British Medical Journal and The Lancet. His publications include "A Case of Congenital Hyperbilirubinaemia (Dubin-Johnson Syndrome) in Pakistan" and "Spirometry in Tropical Pulmonary Eosinophilia".

Death
On 15 December 1971, Rabbee was brutally killed when the Bangladesh Liberation War was ending. The Pakistan occupation army and those that conspired with them took Rabbee from his home. He was taken to Mohammedpur Physical Training Institute and then to Rayer Bazar along with other intellectuals where they were martyred.

Jahan Ara Rabbee (widow of Fazle Rabbee) talked about his death:

The president of Pabna Drama Circle and a leading cultural activist, Gopal Sanyal, said, "When the occupation forces realized that Bangladesh was about to become independent, they killed off the intellectuals who were the greatest minds of the country. These great human beings never got to see the sun rise over the independent Bangladesh."

On 3 November 2013, Chowdhury Mueen-Uddin,  based in London, and Ashrafuz Zaman Khan, based in the US, were sentenced in absentia after the court found that they were involved in the abduction and murders of 18 people – nine Dhaka University teachers, six journalists and three physicians including Dr Fazle Rabbee – in December 1971.

Legacy 

 In 1972, the main student residences of the Dhaka Medical College were named as Dr. Fazle Rabbi Hall.
 In 2015, the Municipal corporation of Dhaka renamed the revitalized South Gulshan Park as the Dr. Fazle Rabbi park.

References

Further reading

External links
  

 

1932 births
1971 deaths
People from Pabna District
Dhaka Medical College alumni
Bangladeshi cardiologists
Bangladeshi activists
Bangladeshi scientists
Bangladeshi humanists
Bangladeshi secularists
People killed in the Bangladesh Liberation War
People murdered in Bangladesh
Dhaka College alumni